The MAC World / International Heavyweight Championship was a Canadian professional wrestling championship created and sanctioned by the Montreal Athletic Commission (MAC). While the Commission sanctioned the title, it did not promote the events in which the Championship was defended. From 1935 until 1938, the American Wrestling Association (AWA) controlled the Championship. The AWA World Heavyweight Championship was recognized by the MAC as the world championship until February 1938 when Yvon Robert was stripped of the title after refusing to wrestle Lou Thesz. A separate world title was created specifically for Quebec and, after the Commission granted promoter Eddie Quinn control of the championship, was used as the main singles title for Canadian Athletic Promotions from 1939 to 1963 and finally by the International Wrestling Association / All-Star Wrestling from 1964 until the mid-1970s. In 1975 the championship was abandoned and replaced by the Canadian International Heavyweight Championship.

Title history

Names

Reigns

References

General
 
 
 
Specific

External links
International Championship at Cagematch.net
MAC World Heavyweight Championship at Johnny O's Wrestling Website
World/International Heavyweight Championship (Montreal version) at Wrestlingdata.com

World heavyweight wrestling championships
Professional wrestling in Montreal